The 1982 BMW Championships was a women's tennis tournament played on outdoor grass courts at Devonshire Park in Eastbourne in the United Kingdom that was part of the Toyota Series category of the 1982 WTA Tour. It was the ninth edition of the tournament and was held from 14 June through 19 June 1982. First-seeded Martina Navratilova won the singles title and earned $23,000 first-prize money.

Finals

Singles
 Martina Navratilova defeated  Hana Mandlíková 6–4, 6–3
It was Navratilova's 9th singles title of the year and the 64th of her career.

Doubles
 Martina Navratilova /  Pam Shriver defeated  Kathy Jordan /  Anne Smith 6–3, 6–4

Prize money

References

External links
 International Tennis Federation (ITF) tournament edition details

BMW Championships
Eastbourne International
BMW Championships
BMW Championships
1982 in English women's sport